Dalneye Stoyanovo is a rural locality (a khutor) in Tkhorevskoye Rural Settlement, Kamensky District, Voronezh Oblast, Russia. The population was 67 as of 2010.

Geography 
Dalneye Stoyanovo is located 15 km west of Kamenka (the district's administrative centre) by road. Sitnikovo is the nearest rural locality.

References 

Rural localities in Kamensky District, Voronezh Oblast